In mathematics, a Euclidean field is an ordered field  for which every non-negative element is a square: that is,  in  implies that  for some  in . 

The constructible numbers form a Euclidean field. It is the smallest Euclidean field, as every Euclidean field contains it as an ordered subfield. In other words, the constructible numbers form the Euclidean closure of the rational numbers.

Properties
 Every Euclidean field is an ordered Pythagorean field, but the converse is not true.
 If E/F is a finite extension, and E is Euclidean, then so is F.  This "going-down theorem" is a consequence of the Diller–Dress theorem.

Examples
 The real constructible numbers, those (signed) lengths which can be constructed from a rational segment by ruler and compass constructions, form a Euclidean field.

Every real closed field is a Euclidean field. The following examples are also real closed fields.
 The real numbers  with the usual operations and ordering form a Euclidean field.
 The field of real algebraic numbers  is a Euclidean field.
 The field of hyperreal numbers is a Euclidean field.

Counterexamples
 The rational numbers  with the usual operations and ordering do not form a Euclidean field. For example, 2 is not a square in  since the square root of 2 is irrational.  By the going-down result above, no algebraic number field can be Euclidean.
 The complex numbers  do not form a Euclidean field since they cannot be given the structure of an ordered field.

Euclidean closure

References

External links
 

Field (mathematics)